HMS Faulknor was a British destroyer of the First World War. She was renamed after the Faulknor family of British nineteenth century naval officers.

Faulknor was a large destroyer leader that served initially in the Grand Fleet, and took part in the Battle of Jutland in 1916. At the end of 1916, she transferred to the Dover Patrol, a force tasked with preventing German raiding craft gaining access to the English Channel. Faulknor carried out both defensive patrols and offensive operations against the coastline of German-held Belgium, taking part in both the First and Second Ostend Raid in the spring of 1918.

In 1920, following the end of the war, Faulknor and her surviving sisters were all returned to Chile, where she served as Almirante Riveros. She took part in the Chilean naval mutiny of 1931 and was stricken in 1933, being sunk as a target in 1939.

Construction and design
Almirante Simpson, the third of the class, was launched on 26 February 1914 and purchased, almost complete, by the Royal Navy on the outbreak of the First World War in August 1914. She was renamed Faulknor and commissioned on 25 August 1914.

Displacement was  normal and  full load. Four funnels were fitted, with one thin funnel forwards and three larger funnels.

The ship was completed with a main gun armament of six 4-inch (102 mm) Mk. VI guns, with two mounted side-by-side on the ship's forecastle forward of the bridge, one on either side of the bridge, and two side-by-side right aft. A single 1-pounder pom-pom was fitted, although this was later replaced by a 2-pounder gun. Four single 21 inch (533 mm) torpedo-tubes were mounted singly on the ship's sides.

In 1918, she was rearmed based on experience of Dover Patrol operations, with the side-by-side 4-inch guns mounted fore-and-aft removed and replaced by two single BL 4.7 inch (120 mm) /45 guns.

Service

Royal Navy
Poor weather led to the abandonment of the operation, however, with four of the six aircraft unable to take off. On 5–7 November and 9–11 November Faulknor took part in patrols off the Dutch coast with the Harwich Force. In November 1914, Faulknor was recorded as part of the 1st Destroyer Flotilla of the Grand Fleet. By March 1915, Faulknor had transferred to the 4th Destroyer Flotilla. Faulknor led an unsuccessful search by twelve destroyers together with several trawlers for the German submarine.

Faulknor was still part of the 4th Flotilla in March 1916, but by 24 April 1916 was leader of the 12th Destroyer Flotilla of the Grand Fleet based at Scapa Flow. Faulknor was still leader of the 12th Destroyer Flotilla at the Battle of Jutland on 31 May – 1 June 1916, operating in support of the Grand Fleet. From about 19:15 hr Greenwich Mean Time (GMT), the Germans launched a series of torpedo-boat attacks against the British battle line, and the 12th Flotilla got into a brief exchange of fire with German torpedo boats of the 3rd Torpedo-Boat Flotilla. At about 01:43 hr GMT on 1 June, Faulknor spotted a group of German battleships and manoeuvred to set up a torpedo attack by her flotilla. Faulknor fired two torpedoes at the German battle line, and while she claimed a single hit, both torpedoes missed although one narrowly missed the German battleship . One torpedo from Onslaught sunk the predreadnought battleship .

U-30s radio signals were also picked up by the British who despatched three formations of warships to intercept the two submarines. Faulknor set off from Cromarty with six destroyers of the 12th Flotilla on 3 November, but was recalled later that day when the British intercepted signals indicating that U-30 had got her engines working again. Both submarines ran aground off Denmark on 4 November, and while U-30 managed to free herself, U-20 could not and was scuttled on 5 November.

The Dover Patrol, protecting the Dover Barrage and shipping in the English Channel from German attack, had a shortage of modern destroyers, and as a result it was decided to transfer Faulknor and sister ship  as reinforcements. Faulknor transferred to the Dover Patrol on 31 December 1916, joining the 6th Destroyer Flotilla. On the night of 25/26 February 1917, Faulknor was one of ten destroyers being held in reserve at Dover in case of German attack, with two light cruisers and four destroyers anchored off Deal in the Downs and five destroyers patrolling the Straits of Dover. German torpedo boats launched a raid on the Dover Barrage and shipping in the Channel that night. The raid was ineffective, with a clash between the patrolling destroyer  causing one group of German torpedo boats to turn back, while a second group of German torpedo boats shelled Margate and Westgate-on-Sea, destroying a house and killing a woman and two children. The stand-by destroyers, including Faulknor, were ordered to form a patrol line in the channel in response, but saw nothing. On the night of 17/18 March 1917, German torpedo boats attacked targets in the Channel again, with two groups (one of 7 torpedo boats and one of 5 torpedo boats) attacking the Dover barrage, while four more torpedo boats (the 2nd Zeebrugge Half Flotilla) attacked the Downs. This time, Faulknor was part of the force defending the Downs. The northern German force torpedoed and sunk a merchant ship anchored outside the entrance to the Downs, and then shelled Ramsgate and Broadstairs before withdrawing. They were spotted by the British torpedo boat  which signalled for help, summoning the naval force protecting the Downs, including Faulknor, but the German force managed to escape without being engaged. The attack against the barrage resulted in the destroyer  being torpedoed and sunk, with the destroyer  being badly damaged by a torpedo when attempting to search for survivors from Paragon.

The bombardment was intended to destroy the locks on the Boudewijn Canal between Zeebrugge and Bruges in order to cut off Zeebrugge from inland ports. While the railway line from Zeebrugge was hit, the locks were undamaged. On 2 June 1917, Erebus and Terror bombarded Ostend, with Faulknor again part of the escort for the monitors. The bombardment sank the submarine  and two barges, while damaging another submarine and three torpedo boats, although the all-important lock gates survived. On 25 July 1917, ships of the Dover Patrol, supported by the Harwich Force, laid a mine-net barrage off the Belgian coast between Nieuport and Zeebrugge. A group of six British destroyers led by Faulknor exchanged long range gunfire with four German torpedo boats during the operation. On 25 September 1917, Faulknor and the destroyer  were damaged by British mines in the mine net barrage across the Dover straits.

On 22 April 1918, the British launched attacks against Zeebrugge and Ostend, with the intention of blocking the entrances to the canals linking these ports with Bruges and thus stopping U-boat operations from the Flanders ports. Faulknor formed part of the supporting force, acting as the flagship of Commodore Hubert Lynes, commanding the Ostend operation, patrolling off Ostend and supporting the small craft taking part in the operation. While the Zeebrugge operation partially blocked the canal locks, that at Ostend was a failure, and it was decided to repeat the Ostend operation as soon as practicable. The operation was repeated on the night of 9/10 May 1918, with Faulknor again serving as Roger Keyes' flagship. The operation was a failure, with the blockship  failing to block the main shipping channel.

Faulknor remained part of the Dover patrol at the end of the war, although listed as under repair.

Chile
The three ex-Royal Navy ships had been considerably changed during their service during the First World War, and were therefore treated as a separate class (the Almirante Williams class) to the two destroyers that were delivered to Chile before the outbreak of the war. Almirante Riveros took part in the Chilean naval mutiny of 1931 and was hit several times by shells when the Chilean Army attacked the naval base of Talcahuano. One of the destroyer's boilers exploded, and she retreated to Quiriquina Island. Five of Almirante Riveross crew were killed. Almirante Riveros was stricken in 1933, and was sunk as a target by the battleship  on 10 April 1939.

Notes

Citations

Bibliography

External links 
 Battle of Jutland Crew Lists Project - HMS Faulknor Crew List

 

Almirante Lynch-class destroyers (1912)
Faulknor-class flotilla leaders
Ships built on the Isle of Wight
1914 ships
World War I destroyers of the United Kingdom
Almirante Williams-class destroyers